Ramin Niami is an Iranian film director, producer, actor and writer. In 1989, he was editor of The Houseguest, a film directed by Franz Harland. During his career, he has participated in more than twenty documentary films. He also made several feature films such as Somewhere in the City (1998) and Paris (2003).

Career
He was born in Tehran, Iran, educated at film school in London and worked as a director and producer on over twenty television documentaries, many of them broadcast by the UK’s BBC and Channel 4, as well as major American networks.  A New York resident for many years, Ramin was a faculty member for filmmaking at the School of Visual Arts in New York.  He also produced Amir Naderi’s festival favorite Manhattan By Numbers in New York.

Niami’s first feature film as a director was Somewhere in the City, starring Sandra Bernhard, Bai Ling, Ornella Muti and Peter Stormare; the film screened at over 25 international film festivals, was released theatrically in the U.S. and on HBO and was sold in countries around the world. After relocating to Los Angeles,  he directed and produced his second feature film Paris which premiered in main competition at the Tribeca Film Festival in New York, starring Chad Allen, Bai Ling, James Russo and Karen Black.  Paris also screened as the opening night film of the Bangkok Film Festival and played many other international film festivals. Paris was released in the U.S. by DEJ/Blockbuster and 20th Century Fox Home Video and broadcast on Showtime/TMC.

Babe’s & Rickey’s Inn was the winner of the Pan African Film Festival Programmer’s Award 2013 and premiered theatrically at Laemmle Monica 4 Plex in LA. It was screened in several other major cities such as New York, Chicago, Dallas, Seattle, Portland, etc. It is also available in the US and Canada through Cinedigm on VOD (video on demand), digital and other on-line platforms.

Niami’s latest film is an Iranian-American romantic comedy feature film he wrote, directed and produced. Shirin in Love set in Los Angeles and Northern California, which stars Nazanin Boniadi (How I Met your Mother, Homeland), Riley Smith (Radio, Freaks and Geeks),  Academy Award-nominated actress Amy Madigan (Field of Dreams, Gone Baby Gone), Maz Jobrani (The Interpreter, founding member of the Axis of Evil Comedy Tour), George Wallace (Funny People, headliner at The Flamingo, Las Vegas), Anahita Khalatbari and Marshall Manesh (Will & Grace, Entourage) was theatrically released in March 2014 as a co-release with AMC Independent in at least 15 major cities in the US.

In 2018, Ramin Niami produced Amir Naderi's film Magic Lantern starring Monk Serrell-Freed, Sophie Lane Curtis, Jacqueline Bisset, Robert Beltran which premiered at Venice Film Festival. His newest film as writer/director/producer, Eye Without A Face, a psychological thriller/horror film starring Dakota Shapiro, Luke Cook, Vlada Verevko was recently released in the US, Canada, and the UK. This is the first collaboration between Ramin Niami and his daughter, cinematographer Tara Violet Niami.

Personal life
Niami is married to actress, producer, and entertainment lawyer Karen Robson. The couple has two children, Tara Violet Niami and Charles Niami. Ramin Niami also has an older daughter, Maya Lidell.

References

External links

 Magic Lantern- Venice

Living people
People from Tehran
Alumni of the University of Westminster
Iranian film directors
1952 births